Razzar is a tehsil located in Swabi District, Khyber Pakhtunkhwa, Pakistan. Its administrative seat is located in Shewa Adda. It consists of different villages and union councils, including, Sheikh Jana ,Yaqubi, Yarhussain, Sudher, Sardcheena, Dobian, Kalukhan, Shewa, Kernal Sher Kali (Naudeh), Adina, Ismaila, Turlandi, Naranji, and Farmoli.Villages Dagi,Taraki and Rashaki are also parts of Razzar Tehsil. The name Razzar is based on the forefather of razzar clan of mandhanr tribe mubarak khan razzar.

References

Tehsils of Khyber Pakhtunkhwa
Populated places in Swabi District